Venkat Gaurav Prasad (born 29 November 1985) is an Indian badminton player.

Achievements

BWF International Challenge/Series (3 titles, 2 runners-up) 
Men's doubles

Mixed doubles

  BWF International Challenge tournament
  BWF International Series tournament
  BWF Future Series tournament

References

External links 
 

Living people
1985 births
People from Ambikapur, India
Indian male badminton players